Jamiu Abiodun Alimi (born 5 October 1992) is a Nigerian international footballer who plays for Sunshine Stars, as a central defender.

Club career
Born in Lagos, Alimi spent his early career with Westerlo and Metalurh Donetsk. He later played for Tavriya Simferopol, Olympiakos Nicosia, Sharks, Shooting Stars, Kano Pillars and Akwa United.

Jamiu joined Akwa United on a two-year deal from Kano Pillars, during the 2017–18 mid-season transfer window. On 27 February 2019, he was loaned out to El-Kanemi for the rest of the season because of lack of playing time after falling out of favour with Akwa United manager Rafael Everton. In September 2019 it was confirmed, that he had joined Sunshine Stars.

International career
He made his international debut for Nigeria in 2015.

References

1992 births
Living people
Sportspeople from Lagos
Nigerian footballers
Nigeria international footballers
K.V.C. Westerlo players
FC Metalurh Donetsk players
SC Tavriya Simferopol players
Olympiakos Nicosia players
Sharks F.C. players
Shooting Stars S.C. players
Kano Pillars F.C. players
Akwa United F.C. players
El-Kanemi Warriors F.C. players
Sunshine Stars F.C. players
Ukrainian Premier League players
Cypriot First Division players
Nigeria Professional Football League players
Association football defenders
Nigerian expatriate footballers
Nigerian expatriate sportspeople in Belgium
Expatriate footballers in Belgium
Nigerian expatriate sportspeople in Ukraine
Expatriate footballers in Ukraine
Nigerian expatriate sportspeople in Cyprus
Expatriate footballers in Cyprus
Nigeria A' international footballers
2016 African Nations Championship players